Kothapalli Geetha is an Indian Politician and a former member of parliament from Araku (Lok Sabha constituency), Andhra Pradesh. She won the 2014 Indian general election from Araku Constituency in a reserved Scheduled Tribe (ST) seat being a Yuvajana Sramika Rythu Congress Party (YSRCP) candidate. She started the Jana Jagruti Party in 2018. She later joined the Bharatiya Janata Party (BJP) on 2019.

Political career 
Geetha was elected as a MP from Araku (Lok Sabha constituency) as YSRCP candidate from the (ST) community. She started, the Jana Jagruti Party, a new political party on 24 August 2018 with the aim of challenging the state's caste politics. In June 2019, She joined the BJP in a meeting with Amit Shah and Ram Madhav.

A petition was filed against Geeta in 2016 claiming that she was not a member of the ST community as she contested in the general elections 2014 in a reserved seat for ST community from Aaraku Parliamentary Constituency and won the elections. An investigation committee formed for the probe and the district magistrate stated that she did not belong to the ST community.

Family and early life
Geetha was born on February 4, 1971, in Thimmapuram, East Godavari, Andhra Pradesh. She was born to Kothapalli Jacob and Lizzamma. She married P.R. Koteswara Rao on August 28, 1989. She has a son and a daughter.

Geetha completed her Bachelor of Arts in the year 1989, Bachelor of Education in the year 1990, both from Andhra University.

Lawsuits

Punjab national bank case 
The Central Bureau of Investigation (CBI) on 30 June 2015 filed a chargesheet against Geetha and her Husband, the managing director of Visweswara Infrastructure, and three others for alleged criminal conspiracy to defraud a branch of the Punjab National Bank in Hyderabad up to ₹42 crore. The CBI reported that the accused gave wrong details to the bank and allegedly cheated the bank which led to the bank losing ₹42.79 crore. Later, her husband was convicted by a special judicial magistrate court and he was ordered to pay the bank ₹25.25 crore and sentenced to two years of simple imprisonment. However, the court acquitted Geetha.

The Punjab National Bank later sued Geetha and her husband in December 2016 for not paying dues worth ₹81.21 crore.

References

Living people
India MPs 2014–2019
YSR Congress Party politicians
Lok Sabha members from Andhra Pradesh
Women in Andhra Pradesh politics
People from East Godavari district
Andhra University alumni
1971 births
Telugu politicians
21st-century Indian women politicians
21st-century Indian politicians
Women members of the Lok Sabha